The British Rabbit Council (BRC) is an organisation for rabbit enthusiasts in the United Kingdom. Rabbits are the UK's third most popular pet.

History
The British Rabbit Council was formed in 1934 when the British Rabbit Society and the National Rabbit Council of Great Britain and her Dominions merged.

Recognised breeds
There are over 50 breeds recognised by the British Rabbit Council and over 500 varieties. These are divided into four groups – Fancy, Lop, Normal Fur, Rex.

Structure
To enter most rabbit shows, participants must be Council members and their rabbits must have a metal ring around one hind leg registered in their name. In breed classes, the rabbits are judged to a standard.

See also

 American Rabbit Breeders Association
 List of rabbit breeds

References

External links
 Official website
 The Official Journal of the BRC

Clubs and societies in Nottinghamshire
Rabbits as pets
Newark-on-Trent
1934 establishments in the United Kingdom
Organizations established in 1934
Pets in the United Kingdom